Dongo is a commune of the Cercle of Youwarou in the Mopti Region of Mali. The principal village lies at Kormou-Marka. In 2009 the commune had a population of 11,421.

References

External links
.

Communes of Mopti Region